Mariel Semonte Orr (November 4, 1987 – June 5, 2022), known professionally as Trouble, was an American rapper.

Early life
Mariel Semonte Orr was born on November 4, 1987, in Atlanta, Georgia. He started rapping at the age of 14.

Career
In April 2011, Trouble released his debut mixtape December 17th, which featured on Complex "25 Best Mixtapes of 2011". The mixtape included the song "Bussin'", which featured Yo Gotti, Waka Flocka Flame, and Trae tha Truth on the remix. In August 2011, Complex included Trouble in its "15 New Rappers To Watch Out For" list. In 2013, he was included in XXL magazine's "15 Atlanta Rappers You Should Know" list.

In 2015, Trouble appeared on Lupe Fiasco's album Tetsuo & Youth, along with Glasses Malone, Trae tha Truth, Billy Blue, Buk, and Fam-Lay in the track "Chopper".

In 2016, Trouble appeared on rapper YFN Lucci's single "Key to the Streets", which peaked at number 70 on the Billboard Hot 100.

In March 2016, Trouble and labelmate Veli Sosa filmed a music video in North Carolina titled "Straight Out" from his 2016 mixtape Skoobzilla and "Like A" which featured ReeseDaGreat, who is also signed to DTE. The videos were filmed by director LookImHD and guest starred Big Bank Black as a cameo in the videos, a snippet of which was later posted on Instagram.

In 2017, Trouble signed a record deal with Mike Will Made It's record label, Ear Drummer Records and Interscope Records.

Death 
On June 5, 2022, Orr was shot during a home invasion at the Rockdale County apartment of a female companion. He was transported to a hospital, where he died at age 34. The suspect, Jamichael Jones, did not know Orr and was involved in a domestic dispute with the woman.

Discography

Studio albums
Edgewood  (2018)
Thug Luv (2020)

Mixtapes
December 17th (2011)
Green Light (2011)
431 Days (2012)
The Return of December 17th (2013)
All on Me (2014)
#ZayDidIt (2015)
Skoob Fresh (2015)
Skoobzilla (2016)
Year in 2016 (2017)

See also
 List of murdered hip hop musicians

References

1987 births
2022 deaths
American male rappers
Rappers from Atlanta
21st-century American rappers
21st-century American male musicians
Deaths by firearm in Georgia (U.S. state)
Trap musicians
Southern hip hop musicians